
Lago del Narèt is a lake in Val Sambuco, Ticino, Switzerland. It is located in the municipality of Lavizzara. The closest village is Fusio.

See also
List of lakes of Switzerland
List of mountain lakes of Switzerland

External links
Laghetti alpini della Svizzera italiana: Attorno al Naret 

Lakes of Ticino
Reservoirs in Switzerland